Lynwood is a ghost town in Rankin County, Mississippi, United States.

History
Lynwood had a post office from 1881 to 1910.  The population in 1900 was 46.

References

Former populated places in Rankin County, Mississippi
Former populated places in Mississippi